Kavel, created in 1969 and coming into effect in 1970, is a single-member electoral district for the South Australian House of Assembly. Located to the east of Adelaide, Kavel is based on the town of Mount Barker and includes much of the eastern portion of the Adelaide Hills.

Kavel incorporates the residential hills suburbs and farming areas of Balhannah, Blakiston, Brukunga, Bugle Ranges, Charleston, Dawesley, Forest Range, Hay Valley, Lenswood, Littlehampton, Lobethal, Mount Barker, Mount Barker Junction, Mount Barker Springs, Mount Barker Summit, Nairne, Oakbank, Totness, Wistow and Woodside. Amongst others, previously abolished seats include Gumeracha and Mount Barker.

Kavel is named after Lutheran pastor August Kavel who migrated to South Australia from (Germany) in 1838 (two years after the colony was founded) with approximately 250 people seeking freedom from religious persecution. They and later German immigrants and their descendants have made a significant contribution to South Australia's development and culture.

Kavel has been held by the Liberal Party (and its predecessor, the Liberal and Country League) for most of its existence. Like most seats in the Adelaide Hills, it has usually been reasonably safe for that party, and has been held by only four members. The first member, Roger Goldsworthy, served as Deputy Premier of South Australia from 1979 to 1982 under David Tonkin. Goldsworthy retired in 1992 to allow former state Liberal leader John Olsen to transfer from the Australian Senate back to state politics. Olsen went on to become Premier of South Australia after a 1996 party-room coup against Premier Dean Brown. Olsen was forced to retire from politics after being caught misleading the House, and was succeeded by Mark Goldsworthy, son of Roger. Mark held the seat until handing it to current member Dan Cregan in 2018. Cregan was elected as a Liberal member, but resigned from the party in October 2021 to sit as an independent. He was re-elected in a landslide at the 2022 election

The strong Family First Party vote of 15.7 percent at the 2006 election, the highest in the state, was due in part to their prominent local candidate, church minister Thomas "Tom" Playford V, son of former Premier Sir Thomas Playford, who had represented Gumeracha decades earlier. Tom Playford V had run as an independent in the 2002 election, achieving a primary vote of 19.4 percent.

Members for Kavel

Election results

See also
 1992 Kavel state by-election

Notes

References
 ECSA profile for Kavel: 2018
 ABC profile for Kavel: 2018
 Poll Bludger profile for Kavel: 2018

1970 establishments in Australia
Electoral districts of South Australia